Erebus orcina is a moth of the family Erebidae. It is found in Indonesia (Moluccas).

References

Moths described in 1874
Erebus (moth)
Moths of Indonesia